Ralph Clyde "Mac" McKinzie (October 1, 1894 – December 7, 1990) was an American football, basketball, and baseball coach.

Coaching career
McKinzie was the head football coach at  Eureka College in Eureka, Illinois for 17 seasons, from 1921 until 1937, compiling a record of Eureka was 36–79–10.

McKinzie was the football coach for Ronald Reagan, the 40th President of the United States.

Recognition
Eureka named its football field, McKinzie Field, after McKinzie.

Head coaching record

Football

References

External links
 

1894 births
1990 deaths
American men's basketball players
Basketball coaches from Iowa
Basketball players from Iowa
Eureka Red Devils athletic directors
Eureka Red Devils baseball players
Eureka Red Devils football coaches
Eureka Red Devils football players
Eureka Red Devils men's basketball coaches
Eureka Red Devils men's basketball players
Northern Illinois Huskies baseball coaches
Northern Illinois Huskies football coaches
Northern Illinois Huskies men's basketball coaches
Wartburg Knights athletic directors
Wartburg Knights football coaches
Wartburg Knights men's basketball coaches
College track and field coaches in the United States
College tennis coaches in the United States
People from Winterset, Iowa